Alex Rae (born 23 August 1946) is a Scottish former football player and manager. Rae played for East Fife, Bury, Partick Thistle, Cowdenbeath and Forfar Athletic. He then managed Forfar Athletic between 1980 and 1983.

References

External links 
 

1946 births
Living people
Footballers from Glasgow
Association football midfielders
Scottish footballers
East Fife F.C. players
Bury F.C. players
Partick Thistle F.C. players
Cowdenbeath F.C. players
Forfar Athletic F.C. players
Scottish Football League players
English Football League players
Scottish football managers
Forfar Athletic F.C. managers
Scottish Football League managers